The 2014 Copa Colombia, officially the 2014 Copa Postobón for sponsorship reasons, was the 12th edition of the Copa Colombia, the national cup competition for clubs of DIMAYOR. It began on June 29 and ended on November 12. The tournament comprised a total of 36 teams. The winner, Deportes Tolima, who defeated Santa Fe 3–2 on aggregate score in the final, earned a berth to the 2015 Copa Sudamericana.

Group stage
The 36 teams were divided into six groups based on each separate region of Colombia. Each group is played in home-and-away round-robin format. The group winners and runners-up, along with the four best third-placed teams, advance to the Round of 16. The matches were played from June 29 to August 27.

Group A

Group B

Group C

Group D

Group E

Group F

Ranking of third-placed teams

Knockout phase
Each tie in the knockout phase is played in home-and-away two-legged format. In each tie, the team which has the better overall record up to that stage host the second leg, except in the round of 16 where the group winners automatically host the second leg. In case of a tie in aggregate score, neither the away goals rule nor extra time is applied, and the tie is decided by a penalty shoot-out.

Bracket

Round of 16
First legs: September 4, 9, 10, 11; Second legs: September 17, 18, 19.

Quarterfinals
First legs: October 1, 2; Second legs: October 8.

Semifinals
First legs: October 22; Second legs: October 29.

Final
First leg: November 5; Second leg: November 12.

Top goalscorers

Source: Copa Postobón

References

External links
 Copa Postobón
 Copa Postobón, DIMAYOR.com
 Copa Colombia 2014, Soccerway.com

Copa Colombia seasons
Colombia
Copa Colombia